Lola the Coalgirl (Spanish: Lola, la piconera) is a 1952 Spanish historical musical film directed by Luis Lucia and starring Juanita Reina, Virgilio Teixeira and Manuel Luna.

It was part of a series of patriotic historical films produced by CIFESA, Spain's biggest film company of the era. Other examples include Madness for Love (1948) and Agustina of Aragon. The film's sets were designed by the German-born art director Sigfrido Burmann. Shooting began in June 1950, with filming at a Madrid studio and on location in Cadiz.

On release the film was a moderate hit but because of its large budget it had not returned all of its cost several years later.

Synopsis
During the Siege of Cádiz a female Spanish innkeeper falls in love with an officer of Napoleon's invading army.

Cast
 Juanita Reina as Lola  
 Virgilio Teixeira as Capitán Gustavo Lefevre  
 Manuel Luna as Mariscal Víctor  
 Fernando Nogueras as Rafael Otero  
 Félix Dafauce as Juan de Acuña  
 Fernando Fernández de Córdoba as General Alburquerque  
 Alberto Romea as Salazar  
 Arturo Marín as Jefe de los gitanos  
 José Isbert as Soldado José Rodríguez  
 Nicolás D. Perchicot as Ventero  
 Antonio Riquelme as Domingo Carmona  
 Miguel Pastor as Venegas  
 Valeriano Andrés as Teniente Jouvert  
 Francisco Bernal as Gerard  
 Alfonso de Córdoba as Lacour  
 Casimiro Hurtado as Zapatero  
 Domingo Rivas as Oficial de alistamiento  
 Manuel Guitián as Ujier de las cortes  
 José Guardiola as Gallardo  
 Concha López Silva as Gitana vieja  
 Ana Esmeralda as 'Bailaora' gitana  
 José Toledano as 'Bailaor' Gitano

References

Bibliography 
 Mira, Alberto. The Cinema of Spain and Portugal. Wallflower Press, 2005.

External links 
 

1950s historical musical films
Spanish historical musical films
1952 films
1950s Spanish-language films
Films directed by Luis Lucia
Films set in the 1810s
Films set in Andalusia
Spanish films based on plays
Napoleonic Wars films
Cifesa films
Films scored by Juan Quintero Muñoz
Spanish black-and-white films
1950s Spanish films